Stuart House is a historic home located at Staunton, Virginia. The original portion of the house was built in 1791, and is a story, temple-form brick structure fronted by a two-level pedimented portico supported by four very simple and provincial Tuscan order-like columns.  The house measures 35 feet square, and is five bays wide and three bays deep.  The house has a large -story brick wing added in 1844.  The wing is fronted by a gallery ornamented with lattice-work and supported on brick piers.  Also on the property is a gambrel roof frame building, erected sometime after 1783 as Archibald Stuart's residence and law office, and a pyramidal roof smokehouse.  According to family tradition, Stuart received plans or suggestions for the house's design from his close friend, Thomas Jefferson.  Archibald Stuart died in 1832 and the house was inherited by his son, Alexander Hugh Holmes Stuart (1807-1891).

It was added to the National Register of Historic Places in 1972.  It is located in the Newtown Historic District.

References

External links

Stuart-Robertson House (Entrance Gates), 120 Church Street, Staunton, Staunton, VA: 2 photo, 2 measured drawings, and 3 data pages at Historic American Buildings Survey

Historic American Buildings Survey in Virginia
Houses on the National Register of Historic Places in Virginia
Houses completed in 1791
Houses in Staunton, Virginia
National Register of Historic Places in Staunton, Virginia
Individually listed contributing properties to historic districts on the National Register in Virginia
1791 establishments in Virginia